The following article is a summary of the 2022 Indonesia national football team international results of each categories.

Men's national football team

Record

Friendlies

2020 AFF Championship

2023 AFC Asian Cup qualification

2022 AFF Championship

Men's under-23 football team

Record

2021 Southeast Asian Games

Men's under-20 football team

Friendlies

2022 Maurice Revello Tournament

2022 AFF U-19 Youth Championship

2022 Costa Calida Supercup

References 

2022 national football team results
Indonesia national football team results